AS Saint-Etienne won the 1973–74 edition of the French Association Football League Division 1 season with 66 points.

Participating teams

 Angers SCO
 SEC Bastia
 Bordeaux
 RC Lens
 Olympique Lyonnais
 Olympique de Marseille
 FC Metz
 AS Monaco
 AS Nancy
 FC Nantes
 OGC Nice
 Nîmes Olympique
 Paris FC
 Stade de Reims
 Stade Rennais FC
 AS Saint-Etienne
 CS Sedan
 FC Sochaux-Montbéliard
 RC Strasbourg
 Troyes AF

League table

Promoted from Division 2, who will play in Division 1 season 1974/1975
 Lille: Champion of Division 2, winner of Division 2 group A
 Red Star Paris: Runner-up, winner of Division 2 group B
 Paris Saint-Germain FC: Third place, winner of barrages

Results

Top goalscorers

References

 Division 1 season 1973-1974 at pari-et-gagne.com

Ligue 1 seasons
French
1